John C. Reilly is an American actor and writer. After his film debut Above the Law, he gained exposure through supporting roles for Days of Thunder, What's Eating Gilbert Grape and The River Wild. Reilly collaborated with Paul Thomas Anderson on several films, including Hard Eight, Boogie Nights, Magnolia and Licorice Pizza. For his role in Chicago, Reilly was nominated for the Academy Award for Best Supporting Actor and the corresponding Golden Globe Award. He worked with director Martin Scorsese on both Gangs of New York and The Aviator. He starred in the comedy Walk Hard: The Dewey Cox Story, garnering him a Grammy Award nomination and a second Golden Globe Award nomination for the song performed in the film, "Walk Hard". Reilly starred with Will Ferrell in Talladega Nights and Step Brothers. He voiced the title character in the commercially successful animated film Wreck-It Ralph and its 2018 sequel. Reilly starred in the television series Check It Out! with Dr. Steve Brule, and played the titular character that originated on Tim and Eric Awesome Show, Great Job!.

Film

Television

Stage

Other media

References 

Reilly, John C.
Reilly, John C.